The Chester L. Krause Memorial Distinguished Service Award (formerly the Farran Zerbe Memorial Award and ANA Distinguished Service Award) is the highest honor conferred by the American Numismatic Association. The award was formerly named after Farran Zerbe, a one-time president of the American Numismatic Association. It is given in recognition of numerous years of outstanding, dedicated service to numismatics. The criteria for the nominee should be that the individual is considered someone who has rendered numerous years of outstanding service to the ANA as well as the field of numismatics.
An additional qualification is that the nominee should be a former Medal of Merit and Glenn Smedley Memorial Award recipient. The award is limited only to members of the ANA. 

In 2021, the ANA Board of Governors voted to change its name to the ANA Distinguished Service Award, following an investigation that uncovered accusations of fraudulent behavior on Zerbe's part. In May 2022, the award was re-named in honor of Chester L. Krause, the founder of Krause Publications.

Winners

1950s
 1951 – M. Vernon Sheldon
 1952 – June T. Pond
 1953 – Col. Joseph Moss
 1954 – Lewis M. Reagan
 1955 – Dr. J Hewitt Judd
 1956 – Richard S. Yeoman
 1957 – No Award Given
 1958 – Burton H. Saxton
 1959 – Louis S. Werner

1960s
 1960 – Glenn B. Smedley
 1961 – Dr. John F. Lhotka, Jr.
 1962 – Lee F. Hewitt
 1963 – Elston G. Bradfield
 1964 – Jack W. Ogilvie
 1965 – Lionel C. Panosh
 1966 – J. Douglas Ferguson
 1967 – Dr. John S. Davenport
 1968 – Oscar H. Dodson
 1969 – Eric P. Newman

1970s
 1970 – Charles M. Johnson
 1971 – Don Sherer
 1972 – Abe Kosoff
 1973 – Matt H. Rothert
 1974 – Herbert Berge
 1975 – Margo Russell
 1976 – Fred C. Bowman and Maurice M. Gould
 1977 – Chester L. Krause
 1978 – William C. Henderson
 1979 – John J. Gabarron

1980s
 1980 – John Jay Pittman
 1981 – Virgil Hancock
 1982 – George D. Hatie
 1983 – Clyde Hubbard
 1984 – Charles L. Krause and Clifford Mishler
 1985 – Adna G. Wilde, Jr.
 1986 – Charles H. Wolfe
 1987 – Virginia Culver and Edward C. Rochette
 1988 – Adeline and Aubrey E. Bebee
 1989 – Harry X. Boosel

1990s
 1990 – James L. Miller
 1991 – Q. David Bowers
 1992 – Paul R. Whitnah
 1993 – Robert L. Hendershott
 1994 – Florence M. Schook
 1995 – Dorothy C. Baber and Bill Fivaz
 1996 – Elvira Clain-Stefanelli
 1997 – Ruthann Brettell
 1998 – Bert and Kenneth E. Bressett
 1999 – Kenneth L. Hallenbeck

2000s
 2000 – Arthur M. Kagin
 2001 – Harry J. Forman
 2002 – Anthony J. Swiatek
 2003 – Lighthouse Family and Charles J. Ricard
 2004 – Gene R. and Patricia Hynds
 2005 – Joseph E. Boling
 2006 – Larry J. Gentile, Sr.
 2007 – Nancy Opitz Wilson and John Wilson
 2008 – Gene Hessler
 2009 – John Eshbach

2010s
 2010 – Beth Deisher
 2011 – Anthony Terranova
 2012 – Arthur M. Fitts III and Prudence Fitts
 2013 – David Schenkman 
 2014 – Neil Shafer
 2015 – Donn Pearlman
 2016 – Mark Lighterman and Myrna Lighterman
 2017 – Brian Fanton
 2018 – Cindy Wibker
 2019 – Thomas Hallenbeck

2020s
 2020 – Walt Ostromecki
 2021 – Kerry Wetterstrom
 2022 - Thomas J. Uram

References

Awards for numismatics
American awards